Philip Goodwin may refer to:

 Philip Goodwin (divine) (died 1699), English clergyman
 Philip A. Goodwin (1882–1937), American politician from New York
 Philip R. Goodwin (1881–1935), American painter and illustrator